Valley Christian Heritage School (VCHS) is a private Christian K-12 school in Alamo, Texas, in the Rio Grande Valley.

It began operations in 1978, and in 1991 received accreditation from the National Christian Schools Association and the Texas Christian Schools Association.

References

External links
 Valley Christian Heritage School

Private K-12 schools in Texas
High schools in Hidalgo County, Texas
Schools in Hidalgo County, Texas
1978 establishments in Texas
Educational institutions established in 1978
Christian schools in Texas